David Bedinadze (born February 5, 1985, in Batumi) is an amateur Georgian Greco-Roman wrestler, who played for the men's lightweight category. He won a silver medal at the 2006 World Wrestling Championships in Guangzhou, China, and eventually defeated Japan's Makoto Sasamoto for the gold in his division at the 2007 World Wrestling Championships in Baku, Azerbaijan. He also added a bronze medal to his collection from the 2005 European Wrestling Championships in Varna, Bulgaria. Bedinadze is a member of the wrestling team for Dynamo Tbilisi, and is coached and trained by Vaza Gravishvili.

Bedinadze represented Georgia at the 2008 Summer Olympics, where he competed for the men's 60 kg class. He lost the qualifying round match to Bulgarian wrestler and two-time Olympic champion Armen Nazaryan, with a three-set technical score (1–1, 4–1, 5–0), and a classification point score of 1–3.

References

External links
NBC Olympics Profile
 

Male sport wrestlers from Georgia (country)
1985 births
Living people
Olympic wrestlers of Georgia (country)
Wrestlers at the 2008 Summer Olympics
Sportspeople from Batumi
World Wrestling Championships medalists